For God and Glory: Lord Nelson and His Way of War is a thematic and biographical study of Horatio Lord Nelson's art of war by New Zealand-born British scholar Joel Hayward. It was published by the United States Naval Institute Press in 2003 and garnered very positive reviews. It was rated as "outstanding" by members of the 2004 University Press Books Committee, a rating defined "as having exceptional editorial content and subject matter" and considered essential to most library collections.

Reception
In the Journal of the Society of Nautical Research, Colin White, a leading expert on Nelson, called the book a "fascinating work of strategic philosophy. ... The result is surprisingly persuasive.  [Its analyses] are thought-provoking and, in places, offer fresh ways of understanding what happened." Similarly, in the International Journal of Maritime History, Paul Webb wrote: "This effort by Hayward merits serious attention. ... [It] provides many fresh insights into the workings of Nelson's mind. ... There is no question Hayward has done his work and supports it by solid research. He poses important questions and proffers plausible answers. He clearly admires Nelson, but is quick to recognise his faults and his contradictory character traits. Any serious Nelson student will benefit from this book."

For God and Glory was rated as "outstanding" by members of the 2004 University Press Books Committee, a rating defined "as having exceptional editorial content and subject matter" and considered "essential to most library collections.

Arabic translation 

In 2021, it was published as an Arabic translation: لله وللمجد: اللورد نيلسون وأسلوبه في الحرب (عمّان - دار أسامة للنشر والتوزيع، ٢٠٢١)

References 

2003 non-fiction books
Biographies (books)
British biographies
British non-fiction books
20th-century history books
Books by Joel Hayward